#DezNat (shortened from Deseret Nation) is a Twitter hashtag that was created in 2018 by Logan Smith, a member of the Church of Jesus Christ of Latter-day Saints (LDS Church) who goes by "JP Bellum" on Twitter. It refers to a loosely affiliated group of LDS Church members who use the hashtag. The Church does not endorse the hashtag and it is unclear how many followers or adherents of the DezNat concept exist. 

Contributors to media outlets The Daily Beast and The Daily Utah Chronicle have described DezNat as an extremist alt-right, white nationalist movement, while those at The Guardian consider the group right-wing with elements of the alt-right and white nationalism. 

Some members of the DezNat community wish to recreate the historical State of Deseret, which the LDS Church declared in the 1840s to cover modern-day Utah and parts of adjacent states, as well as the secession of a theocratic Mormon state. Some DezNat commentators have suggested this should be a white ethnostate. Some have also used neo-Nazi and far-right accelerationist imagery.

Users of the hashtag say they are not alt-right but are simply unapologetic about their beliefs. DezNat supporters have no formal organization but they share a common ideology.  Smith says the hashtag recognizes faithful LDS Church members as "a unique people and should be united spiritually, morally, economically, and politically behind Christ, the prophet, and the church" adding that DezNat "is the idea that devout members ought to work together to support the church, its doctrines, and each other, on social media and in their communities to further build the Kingdom of God". 

The community has been criticised as promoting bigotry and harassment against members of the LGBT community, non-Mormons and ex-Mormons, feminists, abortion advocates, and pornographic film actors. Some have criticized the Mormon blog By Common Consent for being too politically progressive. Members also use bowie knife imagery as a homage to Brigham Young and the concept of blood atonement for certain sins, a practice the LDS Church leadership has disavowed. According to the feminist writer Mary Ann Clements, DezNat proponents regard themselves as being in line with the actions of former church presidents, therefore not supporting polygamy today but referencing it regarding the past (e.g., by portraying Young as a polygamous "chad" or powerful alpha male).

Alaskan government investigation of Matthias Cicotte
In July 2021, investigative journalists at The Guardian identified Matthias Cicotte, an Alaska Assistant Attorney General, as a poster of racist and anti-Semitic Deseret Nationalist content using the Twitter account @JReubenCIark. Following the release of the report, civil rights organizations, including the NAACP, called for the termination of Cicotte from his position and the reopening of his cases. This prompted an investigation from the Alaska Department of Law and Cicotte was removed from his caseload. A Department spokesperson confirmed Cicotte was no longer working for them, stating: "However, although we cannot talk about personnel matters, we do not want the values and policies of the Department of Law to be overshadowed by the conduct of one individual." Shortly thereafter, the deans of J. Reuben Clark Law School, of which both Cicotte and Alaska Attorney General Treg Taylor are graduates, released a statement condemning the "venomous and hateful Twitter messages against a variety of vulnerable groups" from the @JReubenCIark account.

Footnotes

References

Hashtags
Mormonism-related controversies
Latter Day Saint terms
Alt-right